Păulești is a commune of 4,323 inhabitants situated in Satu Mare County, Romania. It is composed of six villages:

Demographics
Ethnic groups (2011 census):

Hungarians: 46.1%
Romanians: 38.9%
Romanies (Gypsies): 10.4%

According to mother tongue, 56.59% speak Hungarian as their first language, while 42.87% of the population speak Romanian.

Twin towns 
Seregélyes, Hungary

References

Communes in Satu Mare County